The Banking Regulation and Supervision Agency, BRSA is an independent agency in Turkey whose task is to regulate and supervise the banking system in the country. It aims to "provid[e] reliability and stability in financial markets", "ensur[e] the efficient running of the credit system", and protect consumer rights.

See also 
 Central Bank of the Republic of Turkey

References

External links 
 Official Website: Banking Regulation and Supervision Agency 

1999 establishments in Turkey
Bank regulation
Regulatory and supervisory agencies of Turkey